Tork Mahalleh or Tark Mahalleh or Turk Mahalleh may refer to:
 Tork Mahalleh, Talesh, Gilan Province
 Tork Mahalleh, Kargan Rud, Talesh County, Gilan Province
 Tork Mahalleh-ye Alalan, Gilan Province
 Tork Mahalleh, Babol, Mazandaran Province
 Tork Mahalleh, Juybar, Mazandaran Province